Fritz W. Scharpf (born 12 February 1935 in Schwäbisch Hall) is a German professor and Emeritus Director of the Max Planck Institute for the Study of Societies. His areas of interest include; the organisational problems and decision processes in governments at all levels; the political economy of inflation and unemployment; comparative political economy of the welfare state.

In 2000, Scharpf was awarded the Johan Skytte Prize in Political Science.

Other awards

 2008 Honorary doctorate of the European University Institute in Florence, Italy
 2007 Science Prize of the Stifterverband
 2007   Lifetime Contribution Award in EU Studies from the European Union Studies Association
 2004   Bielefeld Science Award, (with Renate Mayntz)
 2004   Great Cross of Merit of the Federal Republic of Germany
 2003   Honorary Doctorate, Humboldt University Berlin

Publications
Scharpf is an author of several books and his articles have appeared in numerous journals.

In a 1988 scholarly article, he identified a situation labelled joint decision trap, in which there is a tendency for government decisions to be taken at the lowest common denominator in situations where the decision-makers have the ability to veto the proposals. It is common challenge for federal governments, such as Germany, and the European Union.

References

External links
Seite von Prof. Dr. Fritz W. Scharpf at the Max-Planck-Institut für Gesellschaftsforschung / Max Planck Institute for the Study of Societies in German

German political scientists
Max Planck Society people
1935 births
Living people
Commanders Crosses of the Order of Merit of the Federal Republic of Germany
European Union and European integration scholars
Corresponding Fellows of the British Academy
Max Planck Institute directors